Antonio Hernando Vera (born November 4, 1967) is a Spanish attorney and politician. He was the Spokesperson for the Spanish Socialist Workers' Party in the Spanish Congress of Deputies from 2014 to 2017. He is also an MP for the province of Madrid.

References

1967 births
Living people
Members of the 8th Congress of Deputies (Spain)
Members of the 9th Congress of Deputies (Spain)
Members of the 10th Congress of Deputies (Spain)
Members of the 11th Congress of Deputies (Spain)
Members of the 12th Congress of Deputies (Spain)
People from Madrid
Spanish Socialist Workers' Party politicians
Fellows of the American Physical Society